Xin Feng (born 27 May 1978 in Shanghai) is a Chinese football player as a defender.

Club career
Xin Feng started his professional football career for second tier side Shanghai Pudong before he switched to top tier side Shanghai Shenhua and broke into their team during the 1998 league season when he made four league appearances in his debut season. Xin would also be included in the squad that won the 1998 Chinese FA Cup and by the following season he would start to establish himself as a regular within the team by making thirteen league appearances. After several seasons he would move to Shenzhen Jianlibao where he rose to prominence as a defender and would win the 2004 China Super League title with an unfancied Shenzhen team. During the ACL 2005 game against Suwon Samsung Bluewings he would achieve his personal highlight when he scored with a fierce close shot from a cross to seal Shenzhen's place in the quarter-finals. After five seasons with Shenzhen he would transfer back to his first team Shanghai Pudong, who had moved to Xi'an, Shaanxi and renamed themselves Shaanxi Chanba). For the next several seasons he would go on to be a vital member of the team, however nearing the end of his career the club would allow Xin to leave for free to Shanghai Shenhua.

International career
Xin Feng would have to wait until February 7, 2007 before he made his international debut against Kazakhstan in a 2-1 victory in preparation for the 2007 AFC Asian Cup. Unable to make the squad he was given another chance to prove himself by the new Chinese Head coach Vladimir Petrović in a friendly against Mexico in a 1-0 defeat on April 16, 2008. Unable to recapture his club form for his country, Xin would only play once more for the senior team.

Honours
Shanghai Shenhua
Chinese FA Cup: 1998

Shenzhen Shangqingyin
Chinese Super League: 2004

Jiangxi Liansheng
 China League Two: 2014

References

External links
 
 
 Player stats at sohu.com

1978 births
Living people
Chinese footballers
Footballers from Shanghai
China international footballers
Shanghai Shenhua F.C. players
Shenzhen F.C. players
Beijing Renhe F.C. players
Wuhan F.C. players
Jiangxi Beidamen F.C. players
Chinese Super League players
China League One players
Association football defenders